Jimmy Lindsay may refer to: 
Jimmy Lindsay (footballer, born 1880) (1880–1925), English football player (Newcastle United, Burnley FC, Bury FC)
Jimmy Lindsay (footballer, born 1949), Scottish football player (West Ham United, Watford FC, Colchester United, Hereford United, Shrewsbury Town)
Jimmy Lindsay (footballer, born 1958), Scottish football player and coach (Motherwell FC)

See also 
James Lindsay (disambiguation)